Sara Headley (born April 5, 1985) is an American former professional racing cyclist. Outside of cycling she has a bachelor's degree in nursing, having mostly worked in emergency and acute care. She first became interested in road racing whilst studying at the University of Vermont, but didn't start her road racing career until 2008, whilst working as a nurse. In July 2016 she announced her retirement from competition.

See also
 List of 2015 UCI Women's Teams and riders

References

External links
 

1985 births
Living people
American female cyclists
Place of birth missing (living people)
University of Vermont alumni
21st-century American women